James Sadler may refer to:

 James Sadler (balloonist) (1753–1828), first English balloonist
 Sir James Hayes Sadler (1827–1910), British civil servant
 James Sadler (cricketer) (1830–1865), English cricketer
 Sir James Hayes Sadler (colonial administrator) (1851–1922), Colonial administrator, son of above
James C. Sadler (1920–2005), American meteorologist
 James Robert Sadler, birth name of British actor Jerry Desmonde (1908–1967)
 James Sadler and Sons Ltd, English pottery manufacturer
 James Thomas Sadler (1837–?), English merchant sailor

See also 
 Jim Sadler (1886–1975), Australian rules footballer